Muruzi House is a notable apartment building – a former revenue house in central Saint Petersburg, Russia, constructed in 1870s for count Alexander Dmitrievich Mourouzis (Muruzi).
It is noteworthy for its neo-Moorish architecture and as a place of residence or work of a number of Russian-language literary persons: for example, in 1955–1972 Russian poet Joseph Brodsky resided in the Muruzi house, nowadays his memorial museum is opened at his former apartment. Before him residents included the early 20 century family of authors Zinaida Gippius and Dmitry Merezhkovskiy and later a Soviet and modern Russia prose writer Daniil Granin; Poets' House opened here in 1920 under Nikolay Gumilyov, and Korney Chukovskiy opened a studio for teaching young literary translators under the post-revolutionary publishing project  ("World Literature").

References

Buildings and structures in Saint Petersburg
Tourist attractions in Saint Petersburg
Joseph Brodsky
 
Cultural heritage monuments of regional significance in Saint Petersburg